Donald W. Norcross (born December 13, 1958) is an American politician and labor leader who is the U.S. representative for  in South Jersey. A member of the Democratic Party, Norcross was first elected to this congressional seat in 2014, following the resignation of Rob Andrews. His district covers much of the New Jersey side of the Philadelphia metro area, including Camden, Cherry Hill, Lindenwold, and Glassboro.

Before entering electoral politics, Norcross was involved in the leadership of the International Brotherhood of Electrical Workers Local 351 and was president of the Southern New Jersey AFL-CIO Central Labor Council. He was elected to the New Jersey General Assembly in 2009, but shortly after his term began in January 2010, he was appointed to fill a vacancy in the New Jersey State Senate, where he remained until his election to the House of Representatives.

For the 117th United States Congress, Norcross is a member of the committees on Armed Services as well as Education and Labor. He is a member of the Congressional Progressive Caucus and the New Democrat Coalition, and is a founding member of the Bipartisan Building Trades Caucus.

Early life and education
Norcross was born on December 13, 1958 in Camden, the son of George E. Norcross Jr. and the brother of George E. Norcross III and John C. Norcross. He and his three brothers were raised in Pennsauken Township. He graduated from Camden County College with a degree in criminal justice, and attended Rutgers University-Camden. He was raised in the Lutheran faith.

Career
In 1980, Norcross served as an apprentice in the International Brotherhood of Electrical Workers, eventually becoming assistant business manager of the IBEW Local 351. A former president of the Southern New Jersey Building Trades Council, he served as president of the Southern New Jersey AFL-CIO Central Labor Council for 16 years.

Norcross and his running mate, Camden City Council President Angel Fuentes, were elected to the Assembly in 2009 after Democrat incumbents Nilsa Cruz-Perez and Joseph J. Roberts both retired. Shortly thereafter, Norcross was appointed to the Senate seat vacated by Dana Redd, who was elected mayor of Camden. Norcross won the Senate special election in 2010 to finish out the term, then was reelected to the New Jersey Senate in 2011 and 2013.

U.S. House of Representatives

Elections

2014

On February 4, 2014, South Jersey Congressman Rob Andrews announced he would resign from Congress by the end of the month, and he did so on February 18.

Norcross announced his candidacy on February 5, and within a week, he was endorsed by every New Jersey congressional Democrat, State Senate President Stephen Sweeney, General Assembly Majority Leader Louis Greenwald, Mayor of Camden Dana Redd, U.S. Senator Cory Booker, and former Governor Jim Florio (who represented the 1st from 1975 to 1990).

Tenure

Norcross won the Democratic primary—the real contest in what has long been the only safe Democratic district in South Jersey—with 72% of the vote. He ran in two elections on November 4: a special election for the balance of Andrews's term, and a regular election for a full two-year term. He easily won both over Republican challenger Garry Cobb. He was sworn in on November 12 by House Speaker John Boehner. Since he was added to the House roll on that date, he gained more seniority than other members of the House freshman class of 2014.

Soon after his election, Norcross was appointed assistant whip, a role he reprised after his 2016 reelection. He now serves in a number of leadership roles in the Democratic Caucus, including co-chair of the Rebuilding America Task Force, member of the Steering and Policy Committee, and member of the Communications Committee. He is also the co-founder of the Bipartisan Building Trades Caucus and vice chair of the Bipartisan Task Force to Combat the Heroin Epidemic, and was appointed to the Joint Select Committee on Pension Security.

Hot mic incident
On June 24, 2021, during a remote United States House Committee on Education and Labor meeting over Zoom with Secretary of Education Miguel Cardona, Representative Bob Good was questioning Cardona when someone interrupted by shouting "racist!", while Norcross's name flashed on the screen, leading participants to believe that Norcross made the remark; a later report from Fox News explicitly attributed the outburst to Norcross. A letter signed by every Republican member of the committee demanded an apology from Committee Chairman Bobby Scott for what they considered a "slander" and a "smear" against Good. Scott responded by calling the outburst "inappropriate" and "out of order". Norcross did not publicly address the incident.

Committee assignments
Committee on Armed Services
Subcommittee on Strategic Forces
Subcommittee on Seapower and Projection Forces
Committee on Education and the Workforce
Subcommittee on Health, Employment, Labor, and Pensions
House Democratic Steering and Policy Committee
House Democratic Policy and Communications Committee
Joint Select Committee on Pension Security

Caucus memberships
Founding member of the Bipartisan Building Trades Caucus
Vice Chair of the Bipartisan Task Force to Combat the Heroin Epidemic
New Democrat Coalition
Congressional Progressive Caucus'''
Blue Collar Caucus
Veterinary Medicine Caucus

Personal life 
Norcross is married to Andrea Doran, an echocardiographer. They have two children. Norcross also has a third child, Donald Jr., by his first wife, Nancy. His brother George is a New Jersey Democratic leader and businessman. He has another brother, John, a psychologist, author, and professor at the University of Scranton. Norcross lives in Camden.

Electoral history

New Jersey State Senate

U.S. House of Representatives

Notes

References

External links

Congressman Donald Norcross official U.S. House website
Donald Norcross for Congress official campaign website

|-

|-

|-

1958 births
21st-century American politicians
American electricians
Camden County College alumni
Democratic Party members of the United States House of Representatives from New Jersey
Living people
Democratic Party members of the New Jersey General Assembly
Democratic Party New Jersey state senators
People from Pennsauken Township, New Jersey
Politicians from Camden, New Jersey
Trade unionists from New Jersey